"Push It Baby" is the second single of the album Late Night Special by Pretty Ricky. It was released in March 2007. The single was also featured in television network BET's 2007 Spring Bling event during their performance. Pretty Ricky has performed this song live on BET's video countdown show 106 & Park on May 16, 2007.  The official remix features Sean Paul.

Remix
A promotional CD was leaked onto the internet containing a remixed version of the song.  This version featured Sean Paul, and is the version actually used in the video.  It is the only "official" remix of the song.

Charts

References

2007 singles
Pretty Ricky songs
Sean Paul songs
2007 songs
Atlantic Records singles